Phytomyza is a genus of leaf miner flies in the family Agromyzidae. At least 170 described species are placed in Phytomyza. The type species is Phytomyza flaveola, described by Carl Fallén in 1810.

See also
 List of Phytomyza species

References

Further reading

 Diptera.info
 NCBI Taxonomy Browser, Phytomyza
 

 
Leaf miners
Opomyzoidea genera
Taxa named by Carl Fredrik Fallén